"Michael" Miroslav Sláma (February 17, 1917 in Třebíč, Vysočina, Austria-Hungary – November 30, 2008 in Thousand Oaks, California) was an ice hockey player for the Czechoslovak national team. He won a silver medal at the 1948 Winter Olympics and a gold medal at the 1947 Ice Hockey World Championships. In total he played 26 games and scored 9 goals for the Czechoslovakia national ice hockey team.

Toward the end of World War II, Sláma went to Theresienstadt concentration camp to help people from Třebíč return home. After the communist coup d'état in Czechoslovakia he defected to Switzerland in December 1948 during an ice hockey tournament in Davos, and spent five years as a player and coach there before emigrating to the United States where he became a librarian and library administrator.

After his death in November 2008, his remains were transferred to the Old Cemetery in Třebíč, Czech Republic.

References

External links

1917 births
2008 deaths
American librarians
American people of Czech descent
Czechoslovak expatriate ice hockey people
Czechoslovak expatriate sportspeople in Switzerland
Czechoslovak defectors
Czechoslovak emigrants to the United States
Czech ice hockey defencemen
Ice hockey players at the 1948 Winter Olympics
Medalists at the 1948 Winter Olympics
Olympic ice hockey players of Czechoslovakia
Olympic medalists in ice hockey
Olympic silver medalists for Czechoslovakia
Sportspeople from Třebíč
Czechoslovak ice hockey defencemen